The 1986 United States Senate election in Connecticut took place on November 4, 1986, alongside other elections to the United States Senate and United States House of Representatives. Incumbent Democratic U.S. Senator Chris Dodd won re-election to a second term.

Major candidates

Democratic 
 Chris Dodd, incumbent U.S. Senator

Republican 
 Roger Eddy, Republican National Committeeman

Results

See also 
 1986 United States Senate elections

References 

1986 Connecticut elections
1986
Connecticut
Chris Dodd